Gmina Chrzanów may refer to either of the following administrative districts in Poland:
Gmina Chrzanów, Lesser Poland Voivodeship
Gmina Chrzanów, Lublin Voivodeship